Ethmia euphoria is a moth in the family Depressariidae. It was described by Andras Kun in 2007. It is found in Turkey (Pontus Mountains) and in the Caucasus in Russia.

Etymology
The species name refers to the joyful feeling of the author when discovering the new species.

References

Moths described in 2007
euphoria